Abraham Laboriel Jr. (born March 23, 1971) is an American session drummer. He is the son of Mexican bass guitarist Abraham Laboriel, nephew of Mexican rocker Johnny Laboriel, and brother of record producer, songwriter, and film composer Mateo Laboriel.  He has been the drummer for Paul McCartney's touring and recording band since 2001, as well as for Eric Clapton among others.

Early life 
The son of jazz bass player Abraham Laboriel, Abe grew up playing drums starting at age four. His mother is a classically trained singer.

Laboriel was mentored by well-known percussionists and drummers, including Jeff Porcaro, Chester Thompson, along with Bill Maxwell and Alex Acuña, who had formed the band Koinonia with his father in the 1980s.

He attended the Dick Grove School of Music, studying with Peter Donald, during his junior year in high school. He also attended the Hamilton High School Academy of Music in Los Angeles in his senior year. Here he first experienced the use of programming and became a member of a marching band. He formed a jazz trio with Vernell Brown and Mike Elizondo. In 1989, he was honored by the National Foundation for Advancement in the Arts and Down Beat magazine. He then enrolled at the Berklee College of Music, where he graduated in 1993.

Career 
Laboriel's first break as a drummer was a tour with guitarist Steve Vai. He then toured with Seal, where he was seen by record producers around Los Angeles which led to session work. Laboriel next toured with k.d. lang where Sting saw him and invited Laboriel to join Sting's touring band.  He also toured and recorded in studio with former Menudo member Robi Draco Rosa on his album Vagabundo.

Laboriel has also recorded and performed with Jonatha Brooke, Crystal Lewis, Shakira, B.B. King, Steven Curtis Chapman, Eric Clapton, Johnny Hallyday, Jenifer, Steve Winwood, Les Paul, Ashlee Simpson, LeAnn Rimes, Mylène Farmer, Letters to Cleo, Vanessa Carlton, Kelly Clarkson, Lady Gaga, Tyler Bryant, Steve Lukather, Jerry Cantrell and others. Lewis and Laboriel were also both a part of the Nickelodeon television series, Roundhouse in the 1990s.

For his 2001 album, Driving Rain, Paul McCartney told producer David Kahne he wanted to return to the spontaneity he remembered when working with The Beatles. He recalled that his bandmates and producer would often be hearing the songs he had written for the first time at the start of the recording session, having had no time to learn or rehearse. McCartney felt this made the recordings sound "fresh," and told Kahne he wanted to record this album the same way. To achieve this, Kahne assembled a band of session musicians, Laboriel included, who had never met McCartney until their first day in the studio together. Laboriel has been part of McCartney's recording and touring band ever since.

Laboriel was part of a power trio called The Raging Honkies, together with Michael Landau. He is part of the collective that is Chocolate Genius, Inc.

In 2006 during the show "Avant que l'ombre... à Bercy" ("Before the shadow... at Bercy"), Laboriel sang a duet "Les Mots" ("The words")  with Mylène Farmer. He also played with Sting at the Montreux Jazz Festival that year. Laboriel toured with Eric Clapton and Steve Winwood on their 14-date American Tour in 2009 following their Japanese tour the year before. He made his live debut with Paul McCartney at The Concert for New York City in 2001, and has played on every McCartney tour since then.

In addition to drums, Laboriel also sings and plays bass, guitar and keyboards. When touring with McCartney, he will occasionally switch to one of these instruments to accommodate certain songs and on his 2013 solo album Naked, he played every instrument.

In 2021, Laboriel played drums on Jerry Cantrell's album Brighten. In 2022, he contributed drums and percussion to "Mrs. Mills" on the new solo album Earthling from Pearl Jam singer Eddie Vedder.

Style 
About his playing he noted: "As much as I would love to say I have an original sound, I think the truth is I have an original filter. I'd listen so much and so hard to so many different people that what's original about me is not necessarily what I play but how I play it, how I interpret it hasn't already been done. It's more about the energy and the intensity, it's not about the specific fills, it's more about the intention."

Equipment 

Laboriel endorses Drum Workshop drums, Paiste cymbals, Remo drumheads and Vic Firth drumsticks.

DW Collector's series drums:
26x14" or 28x20" kick drum
14x10" or 15x12" rack tom
16x14" or 18x16" floor tom
18x16" or 20x16" floor tom
14x7" or 14x8" snare drum

Paiste cymbals:
15" 2002 Sound Edge Hi Hats
20" 2002 Crash
22" 2002 Crash
24" 2002 Ride
24" Giant Beat Crash
24" 2002 Crash

Laboriel has his own signature Vic Firth drumstick which is similar to a regular 2B wood tip drumstick but in 17" length.

Discography

References

External links 
 
 Abe Laboriel Jr. at Squarespace
 
 

1971 births
Living people
20th-century American drummers
20th-century American male musicians
21st-century American drummers
21st-century American male musicians
American male drummers
American musicians of Mexican descent
American rock drummers
American session musicians
Berklee College of Music alumni
Hispanic and Latino American musicians
Musicians from Los Angeles
Paul McCartney Band members